Timotheus of Gaza, sometimes referred to as Timothy of Gaza, was a Greek grammarian active during the reign of Anastasius, i.e. 491–518. He is the author of a book on animals which may have been one of the sources of the Arabic Nu'ut al-Hayawan. He also wrote a work in four volumes titled Indian Animals or Quadrupeds and Their Innately Wonderful Qualities or Stories about Animals that survives only in an 11th-century prose summary. This prose summary was a very popular school text, and includes accounts of the giraffe, tiger, and other animals.

References

5th-century Byzantine people
6th-century Byzantine people
Ancient Greek grammarians
5th-century scholars
6th-century scholars
5th-century Byzantine writers
6th-century Byzantine writers